The 2014–15 FC Krasnodar season was the 4th successive season that the club played in the Russian Premier League, the highest tier of association football in Russia. Krasnodar also took part in the Russian Cup and the Europa League for the first time in the club's history, entering at the Third qualifying round.

Squad

Out on loan

Reserve squad

Transfers

Summer

In:

Out:

Winter

In:

Out:

Friendlies

Competitions

Russian Premier League

Results by round

Matches

League table

Russian Cup

UEFA Europa League

Qualifying phase

Group stage

Squad statistics

Appearances and goals

|-
|colspan="14"|Players away from the club on loan:

|-
|colspan="14"|Players who appeared for Krasnodar no longer at the club:

|}

Goal Scorers

Disciplinary record

Notes
 MSK time changed from UTC+4 to UTC+3 permanently on 26 October 2014.

References

FC Krasnodar seasons
Krasnodar
Krasnodar